At the end of each regular season, the Atlantic Sun Conference, branded since the 2016–17 school year as the ASUN Conference, names major award winners in baseball. Currently, it names a Coach, Pitcher, Player, Freshman, and Defensive Player of the Year. The Coach of the Year award, which dates to 1979, is the oldest. The others—Player (1982), Freshman (2001), Pitcher (2004), and Defensive Player (2014)—were added later. Through the 2001 season, the then-existing awards were known as the major awards of the Trans America Athletic Conference, the ASUN's former name.

Through the end of the 2019 season, Stetson has won 29 major awards, the most of any school in the conference.

On six occasions, a team has won swept the major awards given out in a season: Mercer in 1983, Georgia Southern in 1986 and 1987, Stetson in 1989, Florida International in 1995, and Florida Atlantic in 1999.  All six instances came before 2001, when only the Coach and Player of the Year awards existed.

Four individuals have won more than one of the awards. Mercer's Craig Gibson was named Player of the Year in 1985 and Coach of the Year in 2013; Mercer's Chesny Young was named Freshman of the Year in 2012 and Player of the Year in 2013; Jacksonville's Michael Baumann was Freshman of the Year and Pitcher of the Year in 2015; and Florida Gulf Coast's Jake Noll was Freshman of the Year in 2014 and Player of the Year in 2016.

Coach of the Year
The conference's Coach of the Year award is presented annually to the conference's most outstanding baseball coach, as chosen by a vote of ASUN coaches taken at the end of the regular season.  From 1979–1981 and 1987–1992, the award was given automatically to the coach of the TAAC's tournament champion, rather than chosen by the league's coaches.

The award was first presented in 1979.  From 1979–2001, it was known as the Trans America Athletic Conference Coach of the Year award, until the conference switched to its current name for the 2002 season.

With the exception of 2012, the award has been given to the coach of the league's regular season champion in each season since 2004. In 2012, USC Upstate's Matt Fincher was given the award after his team, picked to finish last, finished second in the ASUN.

Stetson's Pete Dunn, who has coached in the conference since 1986, has won the award six times, the most of any coach.  He is one of three coaches to win the award in three straight years (1988–1990), along with Georgia Southern's Jack Stallings (1985–1987) and Florida Gulf Coast's Dave Tollett (2008–2010).

Winners by season
Below is a table of the award's winners since it was first given out in 1979.

Winners by school
The following is a table of the schools whose coaches have won the award, along with the first season each school played baseball in the conference, the number of times it has won the award, and the years in which it has done so.

Because NCAA baseball is a spring sport, the first year of ASUN competition falls in the calendar year after each school formally joined the conference.

Pitcher of the Year

The conference's Pitcher of the Year award is given annually to the best pitcher in the ASUN, as chosen by a vote of the conference's coaches at the end of the regular season.  The award was first presented in 2004, prior to which pitchers were eligible for the Player of the Year Award.

Five of the award's winners—Florida Gulf Coast's Richard Bleier and Chris Sale, Kennesaw State's Chad Jenkins, Stetson's Corey Kluber, and UCF's Matt Fox—have gone on to pitch in Major League Baseball.

Winners by season
Below is a table of the award's winners since it was first awarded in 2004.

Winners by school
The following is a table of the schools whose pitchers have won the award, along with the year each school first played ASUN baseball, the number of times it has won the award, and the years in which it has done so.

Player of the Year

The conference's Player of the Year award is given annually to the best position player in the ASUN, as chosen by a vote of the conference's head coaches at the end of each regular season.  It was first awarded in 1982.  Until 2004, when the Pitcher of the Year award was instituted, both pitchers and position players were eligible.  Before the conference was renamed, the award was known as the Trans America Athletic Conference Player of the Year award from 1982 to 2001.

Two players, both from Stetson, have won the award twice: shortstop Wes Weger in 1991 and 1992 and catcher Chris Westervelt in 2002 and 2004.

Five of the award's winners—Florida Gulf Coast's Jake Noll, Georgia Southern's Todd Greene, Jacksonville's Daniel Murphy, and Stetson's George Tsamis and Kevin Nicholson—have gone on to appear in Major League Baseball.

Winners by season
Below is a table of the award's winners since it was first awarded in 1982.

Winners by school
The following is a table of the schools whose players have won the award, along with the season each school first played ASUN baseball, the number of times it has won the award, and the years in which it has done so.

Freshman of the Year

The conference's Freshman of the Year award is given annually to the best freshman in the ASUN, as chosen by a vote of the conference's head coaches at the end of each regular season. It was first awarded in 2001. Since the ASUN did not change its name from the TAAC until after that season, the award was known as the Trans America Athletic Conference Freshman of the Year for one season.

Three of the award's recipients—Florida Gulf Coast's Jake Noll, Lipscomb's Rex Brothers, and Stetson's Chris Johnson—went on to play in Major League Baseball.

Winners by season
Below is a table of the award's winners since it was first awarded in 2001.

Winners by school
The following is a table of the schools whose freshmen have won the award, along with the season each school first played ASUN baseball, the number of times it has won the award, and the years in which it has done so.

Defensive Player of the Year
The conference began issuing the Defensive Player of the Year Award following the 2014 season.

Winners by season
Below is a table of the award's winners since it was first presented in 2014.

Winners by school
The following is a table of the schools whose players have won the award, along with the year in which each school first played ASUN baseball, the number of times it has won the award, and the years in which it has done so.

References

ASUN Conference baseball
College baseball conference trophies and awards in the United States
NCAA Division I baseball conference coaches of the year
A-Sun
NCAA Division I baseball conference freshmen of the year